Honorino Landa Vera (1 June 1942, in Puerto Natales – 30 May 1987, in Santiago) was a Chilean footballer who played as a midfielder.

Club career
Once Landa received his high-school diploma in 1959, he went to play for the Unión Española (Spanish Union) team. In 1961, he scored 24 goals in the national championship; thanks to this, he was called up for the national team of his country. He stopped playing soccer in 1975.

International career
Landa was the youngest player of the Chile national team that won a third place medal at the 1962 FIFA World Cup on home soil; during the tournament, he was one of the disgraced players directly involved in the Battle of Santiago incident during the Group 2 match between Chile and Italy. After only 12 minutes, Italy's Giorgio Ferrini committed a hard foul on Landa and was sent off, but refused to leave the pitch and had to be dragged off by policemen; Landa retaliated with a punch a few minutes later, but was not sent off. Chile won the match 2–0. Landa also represented Chile at the 1966 FIFA World Cup.

Death
Landa Vera died of cancer in a hospital in Santiago two days before his 45th birthday.

References

1942 births
1987 deaths
Chilean footballers
Deportes Temuco footballers
Unión Española footballers
Chile international footballers
1962 FIFA World Cup players
1966 FIFA World Cup players
Association football midfielders